Sampang is a town, district and the regency seat of Sampang Regency, in the East Java Province of Indonesia. It is located on the south coast of Madura Island. Its population was 124,390 at the 2020 Census.

Climate
Sampang has a tropical savanna climate (Aw) with moderate to little rainfall from June to November and heavy rainfall from December to May.

References

Regency seats of East Java
Madura Island